In American folklore, the snallygaster is a bird-reptile  chimera originating in the superstitions of early German immigrants later combined with  sensationalistic newspaper reports of the monster. Early sightings associate the snallygaster with Frederick County, Maryland, especially the areas of  South Mountain and the Middletown Valley. Later reports would expand on sightings encompassing an area to include  Central Maryland and the Washington, DC, metro area.

History

18th century
The area of Frederick County was settled by German immigrants beginning in the 1730s. Early accounts describe the community being terrorized by a monster called a Schneller Geist, German for "quick ghost." The earliest incarnations of the creature mixed the half-bird features of a siren with the nightmarish features of demons and ghouls. The snallygaster was described as half-reptile, half-bird having a metallic beak lined with razor-sharp teeth, occasionally alongside octopus-like tentacles. The snallygaster was rumored to swoop silently from the sky to pick up and carry off its victims. The earliest stories claim that this monster sucked the blood of its victims. Seven-pointed stars, which reputedly kept the snallygaster at bay, can still be seen painted on local barns.

19th century

It has been suggested the legend was resurrected in the 19th century to frighten freed slaves.

20th century

Newspaper accounts, throughout February and March 1909, describe encounters between local residents and a beast with "enormous wings, a long pointed bill, claws like steel hooks, and an eye in the center of its forehead." It was described as making screeches "like a locomotive whistle." A great deal of publicity surrounded this string of appearances, with the Smithsonian Institution offering a reward for its hide. U.S. President Theodore Roosevelt reportedly considered postponing an African safari to personally hunt the beast. It was later revealed that these reports were part of a hoax perpetrated by Middletown Valley Register editor George C. Rhoderick and reporter Ralph S. Wolfe in an attempt to increase readership. The descriptions they invented borrowed themes from existing German folklore, including dragon-like creatures who snatched children and livestock, and also appeared to invoke descriptions of the Jersey Devil, which had been spotted mere weeks earlier.

On June 22, 1953, Whittaker Chambers (whose home lies in Carroll County, Maryland) used the snallygaster to examine U.S. Senator Joseph McCarthy in his essay "Is Academic Freedom in Danger?" (Life ):  It was a trick of fate in a low comedy mood that Senator McCarthy should first have bounded into public view dragging the unlikely and protesting person of Mr. Lattimore to share with him a historic spotlight so grateful to the one and so acutely unwanted by the other.  It was a trick of fate that, in the case of each, has led to some serious confusions.  For it led to the translation of Senator McCarthy into the symbol of a national snallygaster (a winged hobgoblin used to frighten naughty children in parts of rural Maryland), instead of one of the two things that he obviously is:  an instinctive politician of a kind fairly common in our history, in which case the uproar he inspires is a phenomenon much more arresting than the senator; or a politician of a kind wholly new in our history, in which case he merits the most cautious and coldblooded appraisal.

21st century

In 2008, author Patrick Boyton published a history of the snallygaster, titled Snallygaster: the Lost Legend of Frederick County.

In 2011, an annual beer festival (a "beastly beer jamboree") called "Snallygaster" started in Washington, DC.

The 2017 edition of J. K. Rowling's Fantastic Beasts and Where to Find Them incorporated the Snallygaster into her Harry Potter universe. It is described as a part-bird, part-reptile relative of the Occamy, with serrated steel fangs, a bulletproof hide, and a natural sense of curiosity.

The Snallygaster appears in the 2018 Bethesda game Fallout 76.

The Snallygaster is a Blended Whiskey produced by Dragon Distillery of Frederick, MD and released in 2018.

South Mountain Creamery, a dairy farm located in Frederick County, Maryland, produces an ice cream flavor named Snallygaster. It consists of peanut butter flavored ice cream with caramel swirl, peanut butter cups, and pretzels.

A Snallygaster hunt features prominently in season 5, episode 4 of the Hallmark Channel show Chesapeake Shores.

In 2021, Sarah Cooper, a cryptozoologist in Maryland, opened The American Snallygaster Museum in Libertytown, MD.

See also
 Fearsome critters
 Belled buzzard
 Goatman (urban legend)

References

American legendary creatures
Fearsome critters
Dragons
Frederick County, Maryland
Maryland folklore
Theodore Roosevelt